Revalsche Post-Zeitung was a German-language newspaper which was published from 1689 to 1710 in the city of Tallinn (Reval), in the then Swedish Empire, now Estonia. It was the first ever newspaper published in Tallinn.

In 1699–1710, the biweekly newspaper used the name Revalische Post-Zeitung. From 1697 to 1707, the newspaper's editor was the postmaster Carl Philipp Grubbe.

Out of its approximately 2200 issues, 144 are known to have been preserved until this day.

References

Newspapers published in Estonia
Tallinn